Rathmore may refer to:

Places in the Republic of Ireland
 Rathmore, County Cork, a parish including Baltimore, County Cork
 Rathmore, County Kerry
 Rathmore GAA, the local GAA club
 Rathmore railway station, station serving the town
 Rathmore, County Kildare
 Rathmore, County Westmeath a townland in the civil parish of Kilmacnevan
 Rathmore, County Wicklow, a settlement in Kilbride, County Wicklow
 Rathmore Church, County Meath
 Rathmore Park, a small housing estate in Raheny, Dublin

Places in Northern Ireland, UK
 Rathmore, Bangor, an area in County Down
 Rathmore Primary School, a state primary school in Bangor, County Down
 Rathmore Grammar School, a Protestant school in South Belfast
 Rathmore, County Antrim, a townland in the parish of Donegore, County Antrim
 Rathmore, County Fermanagh, a townland in Belleek, County Fermanagh

Ships
, twin screw steamship